Alexander Juhan (1765–1845) was a violinist, composer, and conductor. He was one of the first American composers of the United States.
Thought to have been born in Charleston, South Carolina, Juhan moved to Philadelphia in  1783 where he worked with Henri Capron, Alexander Reinagle, and William Brown in Philadelphia  from 1786 to 1794.

References

1765 births
1845 deaths
American male composers
American composers